Ruthenium borides are compounds of ruthenium and boron. Their most remarkable property is potentially high hardness. Vickers hardness HV = 50 GPa was reported for thin films composed of RuB2 and Ru2B3 phases. This value is significantly higher than those of bulk RuB2 or Ru2B3, but it has to be confirmed independently, as measurements on superhard materials are intrinsically difficult. For example, note that the initial report on extreme hardness of related material rhenium diboride was probably too optimistic.

Structure
Ruthenium diboride was first thought to have a hexagonal structure, as in rhenium diboride, but it was later tentatively determined to possess an orthorhombic structure.

References

Ruthenium compounds
Borides
Superhard materials